Oliver Snow may refer to:

 Oliver G. Snow (1849–1931), American Mormon leader